Adesmia argyrophylla is an endemic perennial shrub found in North and Central Chile.

References

Shrubs
argyrophylla